RACSA was a private passenger and cargo airline based in Guatemala La Aurora International Airport. It mainly operates charter flights throughout the country. One of its planes was hired by the Guatemalan Air Force and temporarily based at Quetzaltenango Airport after Hurricane Stan in 2005, in order to provide help in remote areas. It is a member in the Association of Private Airlines of Guatemala.  However, its current status (2008) is uncertain.

Code data 

 Call-sign: Racsa

Fleet 

The RACSA fleet included 2 Aérospatiale N 262, TG-JSG (named Cunén); TG-NTR (named Kaibil)

Destinations 
 Charter flights throughout the country

References

Defunct airlines of Guatemala
Airlines disestablished in 2009